Stillwell Russell "Russ" Saunders (January 1, 1906 - April 29, 1987) was an American football fullback in the National Football League (NFL). He played with the Green Bay Packers during the 1931 NFL season.

He was an All-American at USC and was one of the models for the Tommy Trojan statue. He was MVP in the 1930 Rose Bowl when he led the Trojans to a 47–14 victory over the Pittsburgh Panthers.

After playing football, Saunders went on to a career in Hollywood. He was one of 11 All-American football players to appear in the 1930 film Maybe It's Love. In 1938 he was nominated for an Oscar for best Assistant Director for The Life of Emile Zola. He was assistant or Second Unit director on more than 85 films  including PT 109, Hatari!, Arsenic and Old Lace, High Sierra and production manager for Stripes, The Amityville Horror and Bonnie and Clyde among others. His first screen appearance was in the 1927 movie The Drop Kick in which the 1927 USC team appeared. In that film, Saunders appeared along with John Wayne—a teammate from the USC team—and worked on many of Wayne's movies over the following decades.

References

1906 births
1987 deaths
American directors
American football fullbacks
Green Bay Packers players
USC Trojans football players
People from Ardmore, Oklahoma
Players of American football from Oklahoma
Male actors from Oklahoma

San Diego High School alumni